Conkle Lake Provincial Park is a provincial park in British Columbia, Canada, located west of the confluence of the Kettle and West Kettle Rivers. The park size is 587 hectares.

References

Provincial parks of British Columbia
Boundary Country
1973 establishments in British Columbia
Protected areas established in 1973